The Life and Legend of Wyatt Earp is the first Western television series written for adults, premiering four days before Gunsmoke on September 6, 1955. Two weeks later came the Clint Walker western Cheyenne. The series is loosely based on the life of frontier marshal Wyatt Earp. The half-hour, black-and-white program aired for six seasons (229 episodes) on ABC from 1955 to 1961, with Hugh O'Brian in the title role.

Series overview

Episodes

Season 1 (1955–56)

Season 2 (1956–57)

Season 3 (1957–58)

Season 4 (1958–59)

Season 5 (1959–60)

Season 6 (1960–61)

References

Lists of American Western (genre) television series episodes